Encrypt is a television movie that premiered June 14, 2003 on the Sci-Fi Channel. Set in the year 2068, the Earth's surface is in a cataclysmic upheaval, much of it transformed into wasteland by unstoppable storms (the byproduct of the destruction of the ozone layer). It was directed by Oscar Luis Costo.

Plot
A few survivors have dedicated themselves to preserving and protecting what is left of mankind; among these is former Army Captain John Thomas Garth (Grant Show). Approached by Lapierre (Steve Bacic), a former comrade now employed by eco-profiteer Anton Reich (Art Hindle), Garth is made an offer he cannot refuse. In exchange for his father's and other's survival, Reich agrees to lead a small team of mercenaries into the impenetrable Vincent estate to "liberate" the priceless works of art that had been stored there. Accompanied by reconnaissance specialist Fernandez (Naomi Gaskin), sniper King (Matthew G. Taylor), and tech genius Ebershaw (Wayne Ward), Garth must find a way to circumvent Encrypt, the deadly computerized security system surrounding the estate. Other obstacles include the Rook, a killer robot, and Diana (Vivian Wu), the holographic security chief of the estate. With the help of Lapierre, Garth destroys the Rook and discovers that it actually protects a device that can restore the ozone layer. With the help of Diana, Garth triggers it, but presumably dies soon afterwards.

Cast
 Grant Show as John Garth
 Vivian Wu as Diana
 Steve Bacic as LaPierre
 Matthew G. Taylor as King
 Naomi Gaskin as Hernandez
 Wayne Ward as Ebershaw
 Art Hindle as Anton Reich
 Hannah Lochner as Mandy
 Vickie Papavs as Mandy's Mom
 Martin O'Carrigan as Garth's Dad
 Carolyn Goff as Elaine, Garth's Wife

References

External Links
 

2003 films
2003 television films
2003 science fiction films
2068
American robot films
English-language Canadian films
Canadian science fiction television films
American dystopian films
Films about artificial intelligence
Films set in the 2060s
American post-apocalyptic films
Syfy original films
2000s American films
2000s Canadian films